St John's Church, Ousebridge, Micklegate, York is a Grade II* listed former parish church in the Church of England in York.

History
The church dates from the 12th century, the oldest part being the based on the tower. The chancel is 14th century. The north aisle and arcade were rebuilt, and the west end extended in the 15th century. The tower collapsed in 1551 and part of the north aisle was rebuilt.

The church was restored in 1850 by George Fowler Jones, when the south porch was added, and the east end rebuilt. The windows were reglazed, a new floor laid and new pews were added. In 1866 J. B. and W. Atkinson of York re-roofed the nave.  In 1960, its east wall was rebuilt to allow Micklegate to be widened, and a new porch was added.

In 1934 the church was closed, and the Institute of Advanced Archaeological Studies used the building to store its collection. It later became York Arts Centre, and more recently has been used as a bar.

Memorials

Nathaniel Wilson (d. 1726)
Elizabeth Wilson (d. 1736)
Sir Richard Yorke (d. 1498)
John Scott (d. 1775)
Christopher Benson (d. 1801)
Anne Haynes (d. 1747)
Elizabeth Potter (d. 1766)
Luke Thompson (d. 1743)
Grace Potter (d. 1776)
Thomas Bennett (d. 1773)
Elizabeth Bennett (d. 1825)

Organ

The pipe organ dated from 1866 and was by Postill. A specification of the organ can be found on the National Pipe Organ Register.

References

John
John
Former Church of England church buildings
Micklegate